Kalat Division or Qalat Division is an administrative division of Balochistan Province of Pakistan. Its capital city is Khuzdar. The area of Kalat Division is 140,612 km².

In 2015, the Balochistan Assembly unanimously passed a resolution calling upon the provincial government to establish a new Rakhshan Division comprising the districts of Nushki, Chagai, Kharan and Washuk which were parts of Quetta and Kalat.

History 
Kalat division established after dissolution of Balochistan state union in 14 October 1955.When the Baluchistan States Union became Kalat Division, Khuzdar was established as the divisional headquarters.

In 1960, Lasbela district transferred to form Karachi-Bela division but 1972, Lasbela district again become a part of Kalat division.

Districts 
It contains the following districts:

 Awaran District
 Hub District
 Kalat District
 Khuzdar District
 Lasbela District
 Mastung District
 Surab District

Demographics 
According to 2017 census, Kalat division had a population of 2,513,200, which includes 1,309,400 males and 1,203,698 females. 
Qalat division constitutes  2,495,105 Muslims, 14,505 Hindus, 1,996 Christians followed by 634 scheduled castes and 960 others.

See also
Divisions of Pakistan

References

Divisions of Balochistan